Carrigdhoun GAA is one of the eight baronies or Gaelic Athletic Association divisions that make up Cork. The division is made up of eleven Gaelic Athletic Association teams, making it one of the smaller divisions.
The division is also known as the South East division. It extends from just south of Cork city down to Ballinspittle in the south of the county.
The 11 teams are Ballinhassig, Ballygarvan, Ballymartle from Riverstick, Belgooly, Carrigaline, Crosshaven, Courcey Rovers from Ballinadee and Ballinspittle, Kinsale, Shamrocks from Ringaskiddy/Monkstown, Tracton from Minane Bridge, and Valley Rovers from Innishannon. The division selects players from all clubs except any that is senior (at present Courcey Rovers in hurling and Valley Rovers and Carrigaline in football) to represent the division in the Cork Senior Hurling Championship and in the Cork Senior Football Championship. The division's team wear a black and gold strip.
The division organises championships from Junior and Under 21 levels. It used to run competitions from Under-12 to Minor (Under-18) until these were reorganised by the Cork County Board.

History
The division was formed in 1926 when the county was divided into 8 different divisions.

Member Clubs
 Ballinhassig
 Ballygarvan
 Ballymartle
 Belgooly
 Carrigaline
 Courcey Rovers
 Crosshaven
 Kinsale
 Shamrocks
 Tracton
 Valley Rovers

Honours
 Cork Senior Hurling Championship, Runners-Up 1945
 Cork Senior Camogie Championship, Winners 2004

Notable players
 John Kevin Coleman
 Martin Coleman
 Martin Coleman, Jnr
 Patrick Collins
 Terry Kelly
 Kieran Kingston
 Brendan Lombard
 Seán McCarthy
 Con Murphy
 Nicholas Murphy
 Michael Prout
 Alan Quirke
 Ger Spillane

Hurling

Competitions 

 South East Junior A Hurling Championship
 Carrigdhoun Junior B Hurling Championship
 Carrigdhoun Junior A Hurling League
 Carrigdhoun Under-21 Hurling Championship

Grades

Football

Competitions 
 South East Junior A Football Championship
 Carrigdhoun Junior B Football Championship
 Carrigdhoun Junior A Football League
 Carrigdhoun Under-21 Football Championship

2023 Grades 

Divisional boards of Cork GAA
Gaelic games clubs in County Cork